Maheno is a small North Otago township south of Oamaru in New Zealand. The area has 75 residents. A number of the town's streets are named after places in Tyne and Wear, England, such as Whickham, Felling, Heworth and Jarrow. One of two New Zealand's hospital ships in World War I, the SS Maheno, was named after this town.

Demographics
It is part of a larger statistical area also called Maheno.

Maheno settlement had a population of 126 at the 2018 New Zealand census, an increase of 18 people (16.7%) since the 2013 census, and a decrease of 18 people (−12.5%) since the 2006 census. There were 54 households. There were 66 males and 60 females, giving a sex ratio of 1.1 males per female. The median age was 54.7 years (compared with 37.4 years nationally), with 12 people (9.5%) aged under 15 years, 21 (16.7%) aged 15 to 29, 63 (50.0%) aged 30 to 64, and 30 (23.8%) aged 65 or older.

Ethnicities were 92.9% European/Pākehā, 7.1% Māori, and 2.4% other ethnicities (totals add to more than 100% since people could identify with multiple ethnicities).

Although some people objected to giving their religion, 52.4% had no religion, and 35.7% were Christian.

Of those at least 15 years old, 9 (7.9%) people had a bachelor or higher degree, and 33 (28.9%) people had no formal qualifications. The median income was $22,200, compared with $31,800 nationally. The employment status of those at least 15 was that 51 (44.7%) people were employed full-time, 21 (18.4%) were part-time, and 3 (2.6%) were unemployed.

Maheno statistical area

Maheno had a population of 1,968 at the 2018 New Zealand census, an increase of 150 people (8.3%) since the 2013 census, and an increase of 93 people (5.0%) since the 2006 census. There were 789 households. There were 984 males and 984 females, giving a sex ratio of 1.0 males per female. The median age was 49.8 years (compared with 37.4 years nationally), with 342 people (17.4%) aged under 15 years, 216 (11.0%) aged 15 to 29, 978 (49.7%) aged 30 to 64, and 426 (21.6%) aged 65 or older.

Ethnicities were 94.4% European/Pākehā, 6.6% Māori, 0.9% Pacific peoples, 2.7% Asian, and 1.4% other ethnicities (totals add to more than 100% since people could identify with multiple ethnicities).

The proportion of people born overseas was 11.6%, compared with 27.1% nationally.

Although some people objected to giving their religion, 53.7% had no religion, 37.3% were Christian, 0.2% were Muslim, 0.5% were Buddhist and 1.5% had other religions.

Of those at least 15 years old, 276 (17.0%) people had a bachelor or higher degree, and 369 (22.7%) people had no formal qualifications. The median income was $27,800, compared with $31,800 nationally. 231 people (14.2%) earned over $70,000 compared to 17.2% nationally. The employment status of those at least 15 was that 786 (48.3%) people were employed full-time, 288 (17.7%) were part-time, and 33 (2.0%) were unemployed.

St Andrew's Maheno

St Andrew's Church in Maheno is part of the Anglican Parish of Oamaru-Maheno.  Services are held every Sunday at 9am, apart from in January.

Maheno rugby

The Maheno Rugby Football Club play their home games at the Maheno Domain. The Maheno domain is situated along Kakanui Valley road, in Maheno.

Maheno School

Maheno School opened on 11 October 1875, to the delight of many local parents. Peter Williams donated the valuable site in the centre of the town, while £150 had been locally subscribed to add to the £325 granted by the Government. The architect was Thomas Forrester, and Robert Peattie became the first teacher from 14 applicants.

On the opening day fifty children were enrolled, and by mid-1876 the school roll stood at 72 pupils.

The school went through numerous improvements starting with an additional classroom in 1883. By 1907 the school needed a third classroom to cope with a growing roll.
1946 – The main block of the new school was built
1957 – The school swimming pool was built
1960 – The infant block was built
1963 – The school dental clinic opened
2013 – Work started on new main office and library refit

In 2013 principal Murray Nelson retired after 21 years heading the school.

In 2015, 2017 and 2019 school pupils have visited the wreck of the SS Maheno which is situated on Fraser Island, in Queensland, Australia.

References

External links

 Maheno School
 St Andrew's Maheno
 Maheno Tavern

Waitaki District
Populated places in Otago